How TV Ruined Your Life is a six-episode BBC Two television series written and presented by Charlie Brooker. Charlie Brooker, whose earlier TV-related programmes include How to Watch Television, Charlie Brooker's Screenwipe and You Have Been Watching, examines how the medium has bent reality to fit its own ends.  Produced by Zeppotron, the series aired its first episode in January 2011.

Format
The format of the series is similar to that of some of Brooker's other works, such as the abovementioned Screenwipe and  Charlie Brooker's Weekly Wipe, with Brooker effectively narrating from a living room set while watching TV. In this series, however, each episode focuses on a particular theme, which Brooker considers to have significantly impacted or have been significantly impacted by TV. Each episode is loosely chronological, starting with earlier TV programmes and adverts, with Brooker commenting on the changes in these over time. A number of clips relevant to the subject and time period at hand are shown, which Brooker usually criticises for being hyperbolic or overly fanciful. Each episode contains a few sketches or fake news broadcasts satirising a particular aspect of the topic discussed. For example, in the first episode, Fear, there is a sketch parodying hyperbolic disaster docudramas, wherein mundane items – first pens, then keyboards, then people's 'voices' – begin to get "hot", scalding their users and plunging the Earth into a new dark age before causing it to explode. He ends each episode with a concluding overview of what he sees as the current attitude TV and the public has towards the subject.

Reception
The series was reviewed mildly positively, with some criticism of the series' topic (criticism of television), some positive remarks about specific segments, and some abuse in jest from Brooker's colleagues at The Guardian: "Ha!  I mean, boo! I hate him." In the Scotsman, it was noted that "though so far Brooker hasn't been pulling any punches", some of Brooker's topics were deemed too broad, some of his targets were called "too familiar", like his mockery of 1970s public service safety announcements, and Brooker himself "may be heading towards one of those programmes he has so savagely parodied."  The Metro enjoyed Brooker's making "merrily sardonic hay", and found his skewering of some TV fearmongering "spot on", but found his targets pretty easy, "nicking TV news ('like looking directly in the face of terror') with flesh-wounds when once upon a time he would have gone for the heart", and described the show as "cobbled together."

Episodes

See also
 Charlie Brooker's Screenwipe
 Newswipe with Charlie Brooker

References

External links

2011 British television series debuts
2011 British television series endings
Television series created by Charlie Brooker
BBC television comedy
Television series about television
Television series by Endemol
Television series by Zeppotron